The Ghana Democratic Republican Party is a political party registered in Ghana. It was founded in 1992. Its current leader is Kofi Amoah. It holds no seats in parliament at present.

See also
 List of political parties in Ghana

References

1992 establishments in Ghana
Political parties established in 1992
Political parties in Ghana